Konstantin Alekseevich Nevolin (1806–1855) was a Russian legal historian.

Academic career

He started his academic career as a professor of law in Berlin in 1829. In 1834 he returned to Kiev after he was appointed rector of the newly founded University of Kiev. Later he also served as a professor of law at Saint Petersburg State University from 1843.

Monographs

Nevolin compiled his two-volume Encyclopedia of Jurisprudence (vols. 1–2, 1839–1840), on the history of government. It was heavily influenced by Hegel's Philosophy of Right. His other monographs include History of Russian Civil Laws (vols. 1–3, 1851), The Formation of Governmental Administration in Russia From Ivan III up to Peter the Great (1844), On the Novgorod Piatiny and Pogosty in the XVI Century (1853) and A General List of Russian Cities (1844).

References

External links
Biography (Russian)

1806 births
1855 deaths
People from Kirov Oblast
People from Orlovsky Uyezd (Vyatka Governorate)
Legal historians
19th-century historians from the Russian Empire
Russian legal scholars
Emigrants from the Russian Empire to the Austrian Empire
Rectors of Taras Shevchenko National University of Kyiv
Demidov Prize laureates